is the sixth studio album by the Japanese rock band Buck-Tick. It was released on cassette and CD on February 21, 1991 through Victor Entertainment. The album was digitally remastered and re-released on September 19, 2002, with two bonus tracks. It was remastered and re-released again on September 5, 2007. "Speed", "M・A・D" and "Jupiter" were later re-recorded for the group's compilation album Koroshi no Shirabe: This Is Not Greatest Hits (1992). The album peaked at number two on the Oricon charts. It was certified platinum (400,000 copies sold) within a month of its release, and has sold 326,580 copies during its run in the Oricon album chart. It was named number 40 on Bounces 2009 list of 54 Standard Japanese Rock Albums.

Track listing

Personnel
 Atsushi Sakurai - lead vocals
 Hisashi Imai - lead guitar, backing vocals
 Hidehiko Hoshino - rhythm guitar, backing vocals
 Yutaka Higuchi - bass
 Toll Yagami - drums

Additional performers
 Tsutomu Nakayama - keyboards
 Takeharu Hayakawa - electric cello
 Hidekazu Tokumitsu - string arrangement

Production
 Buck-Tick - producers
 Osamu Takagi - executive producer
 Hitoshi Hiruma - engineer, mixing
 Yasuaki Shindoh; Makoto Kondoh; Shigetoshi Naitoh; Takashi Aonuma; Fumio Hasegawa; Hirohito Fujishima - assistant engineers
 Higashi Ishida - art coordination
 Ken Sakaguchi - cover art, graphic design
 Atsushi Ueda - photography

References

Buck-Tick albums
Victor Entertainment albums
1991 albums
Japanese-language albums